Steven Daniel Hewitt (born 5 December 1993) is an English footballer who plays as an attacking midfielder for Wythenshawe Town.

Hewitt started his career in the youth teams of Blackburn Rovers and Stockport County before signing two-year scholarship terms with Burnley in 2010. He signed his first professional contract in October 2011, on a two-and-a-half-year deal. He made his debut for the club in April 2012.

Career

Youth
Born in Wythenshawe , Hewitt started his career with Blackburn Rovers as a 9-year-old but was released in 2003 due to his lack of height and speed. He then went on to play for Stockport County for three years, but left because he didn't enjoy the football and went back to playing for his local team. Aged fourteen he was sent on a six-week trial period to Burnley and was signed by the club. He went on to play for the club's youth team aged fifteen and also participated in the prestigious Milk Cup in the Republic of Ireland. In 2010, Hewitt signed a two-year scholarship with the Clarets. He was part of the squad that got to the FA Youth Cup semi-finals for the first time since 1978, scoring against Boston United, Ipswich Town and West Bromwich Albion in the process. He scored a penalty in the 3–1 aggregate defeat against Blackburn Rovers in the semi-final.

Professional

After impressing during his first year as an apprentice he was taken on the five-day first team pre-season tour to South West England in July 2011. He was an unused substitute for the 2–0 defeat to Bristol Rovers but featured as a substitute in a 3–1 win over Torquay United. In August 2011, Hewitt was given squad number 33, and appeared on the bench for the first time in a 3–2 League Cup win over Barnet. In October, he signed his first professional contract with the club, on a two-and-a-half-year deal. In March 2012, he was included in the first team squad for the Football League Championship match with West Ham United at Turf Moor, again remaining an unused substitute in a 2–2 draw. He made his professional debut on 6 March 2012, in a 1–0 win over Brighton & Hove Albion, coming on as a late substitute for Charlie Austin.

On 31 January 2013, he joined Football Conference side Alfreton Town on loan until 20 April.

In March 2015, he joined Conference Premier side Southport on loan until the end of the season.

On 31 December 2015 it was confirmed that Hewitt would join National League side Chester until the end of the season.

On 11 July 2016 it was confirmed that Hewitt would join League 2 side Accrington Stanley on a 1-year deal.

On 28 August 2020, Hewitt returned to Wales signing for Aberystwyth Town.

Career statistics

References

External links

1993 births
Footballers from Manchester
Living people
English footballers
Association football midfielders
Burnley F.C. players
Alfreton Town F.C. players
Southport F.C. players
Chester F.C. players
Accrington Stanley F.C. players
Bangor City F.C. players
English Football League players
National League (English football) players
Aberystwyth Town F.C. players
Wythenshawe Town F.C. players